Ammanford railway station in Ammanford, Carmarthenshire, Wales, is  north of Swansea on the Heart of Wales Line. The station opened in 1841 as a temporary terminus of the Llanelly Railway's line to Llandeilo, making it one of the country's earliest railway stations.

Originally called Duffryn, and then Tirydail, the station underwent a number of name changes before being renamed Ammanford and Tirydail in 1960 following the closure in 1958 of Ammanford station on the Amman Valley branch railway. In 1973, it became Ammanford.

At some point between 1891 and 1906 the passenger platform was moved from the north to the south side of the level crossing. As with most of the stations on the Heart of Wales Line, the original station buildings and signal box have been demolished and now the only structures are a platform and shelter.

History
 
Opened by the Llanelly Railway on 6 May 1841, the station was taken over jointly by the Great Western Railway and London and North Western Railway in 1873. It became part of the London, Midland and Scottish Railway as a result of the Grouping of 1923. The station then passed, upon nationalisation of the railways in 1948, to the Western Region of British Railways. Under British Rail sectorisation from the 1980s until railway privatisation, Ammanford station was served by Regional Railways.

The station also had a passing loop until 1966, but this was removed when the line's signalling was simplified and many of the intermediate signal boxes (and some stations) closed when the Heart of Wales lime was rationalised.

Facilities
Amenities at the station are basic (despite it being one of the largest towns served on the route), with no ticket provision of any kind (these must be bought on the train or prior to travel).  As well as the aforementioned shelter and a bicycle rack, there is a customer help point at the station entrance and a digital CIS display to provide real-time train running information.

Services
All trains serving the station are operated by Transport for Wales. Northbound trains must stop here in order for the train crew to activate the controls for the half-barrier level crossing, but for southbound trains it is a request stop.

References

External links

 
 
 Station on navigable O.S. map. Station due north of Pantyffynnon.

Heart of Wales Line
Railway stations in Carmarthenshire
DfT Category F2 stations
Former Great Western Railway stations
Railway stations in Great Britain opened in 1841
Railway stations served by Transport for Wales Rail
Railway request stops in Great Britain
railway station